Pieter Daniel Moeskops (13 November 1893 – 16 November 1964) was a Dutch cyclist, who won the UCI Track Cycling World Championships - Men's Sprint in 1921-1924 and 1926.

Born in Loosduinen, as a boy he rode a delivery bike for his father's business. By 1914 he became the first Netherlands sprint champion, but the outbreak of the First World War meant that no international matches were organised. Only after the war could Moeskops turn professional.

In 1921 he won his first UCI World Title, beating the reigning world champion from Australia, Bob Spears. He retained the world title again for the next three years, and won it again in 1926. In 1925, in Amsterdam, he was beaten in the semi-finals. In 1929 and 1930 he reached the finals but was defeated by the Frenchman Lucien Michard. He was eight times Dutch professional champion, the last time in 1932.

Moeskops was a good tactician, studying opponents carefully so that he could predict where someone would attack him. For a cyclist he was very tall and was known as "Big Pete".

In 1930 Moeskops underwent major surgery which accelerated the end of his cycling career. His last major victory was in the Grand Prix of Alis (France) in 1933. In retirement he became the owner of a café. He was a national hero, and in 1963 he appeared on the television programme Voor de vuist weg with Willem Duys. A year later he died in The Hague, at 71 years of age.

Moeskops is buried at the 'Old Oak' cemetery in the Den Haag Dunes. The municipalities of Krugersdorp and Nijmegen, and the Loosduinen district of The Hague, have streets named after him.

References

1893 births
1964 deaths
Dutch male cyclists
Cyclists from The Hague
UCI Track Cycling World Champions (men)
Dutch track cyclists
19th-century Dutch people
20th-century Dutch people